The Brigham City Fire Station/City Hall, at 6 N. Main St. in Brigham City, Utah, was built in 1909.  It was listed on the National Register of Historic Places in 1988.

It was designed by architect Andrew Funk and was built as a fire station in 1909.  Its hose tower was designed to rise .

It was remodelled in 1935 to serve as city offices, to design by Carson F. Wells.

References

Fire stations in Utah
National Register of Historic Places in Box Elder County, Utah
Mission Revival architecture in Utah
Fire stations completed in 1909